, is one of the original 40 throws of Judo as developed by Jigoro Kano. It belongs to the fifth group,
Gokyo, of the traditional throwing list, Gokyo (no waza), of Kodokan Judo. It is also part of the current 67 Throws of Kodokan Judo. It is classified as a foot technique, Ashi-waza.

Technique description 
Similar to Osotogari with the exception that the tori's attacking foot is placed behind both of uke's legs, rather that only the near leg.

Technique history

Included systems 
Systems:
Kodokan Judo, Judo Lists
Lists:
The Canon Of Judo
Judo technique

Similar techniques, variants, and aliases 
English aliases:
Large outer wheel

Similar techniques:
O Soto Gari: action on one leg

Judo technique
Throw (grappling)